From Bliss to Devastation is the fourth studio album by hardcore band Vision of Disorder, released in 2001. This album has more of an alternative metal sound mixed with hard rock and nu metal. It was also the last album released by the band before their breakup in 2002. A follow up, The Cursed Remain Cursed, was released on September 18, 2012.

Track listing
"Living to Die" - 4:06
"Southbound" - 4:52
"Itchin' to Bleed" - 2:57
"Sunshine" - 3:00
"On the Table" - 3:51
"From Bliss to Devastation" - 6:11
"Downtime Misery" - 3:50
"Pretty Hate" - 4:14
"Without You" - 3:15
"Overrun" - 3:47
"Done In" - 3:10
"Regurgitate" - 3:06
"Walking the Line" - 3:45
"In the Room"  (New Version) (Japanese bonus track) - 3:03
"Blacktoned Child"  (Japanese bonus track) - 3:08

References

2001 albums
Vision of Disorder albums
Albums produced by Machine (producer)